Braniștea is a commune in Galați County, Western Moldavia, Romania with a population of 4,020 people. It is composed of four villages, Braniștea, Lozova, Traian and Vasile Alecsandri.

References

Communes in Galați County
Localities in Western Moldavia